The first McConnell government was formed by Jack McConnell on 22 November 2001 during the 1st Scottish Parliament, following Henry McLeish's resignation as First Minister of Scotland as a consequence of the Officegate scandal. The first McConnell government was a continuation of the Labour–Liberal Democrat coalition that had existed under the previous McLeish and Dewar governments. It ended on 20 May 2003 following the 2003 election to the 2nd Scottish parliament, which saw McConnell returning to office as first minister to form a second government.

History 

Henry McLeish resigned as first minister and leader of Scottish Labour in the aftermath of the Officegate scandal, which centred on expenses claimed for his Glenrothes constituency office. McConnell was elected as Labour leader and was nominated for the post of first minister by a vote of the Scottish Parliament on 22 November, defeating Scottish National Party leader John Swinney, Scottish Conservative leader David McLetchie and Independent MSP Dennis Canavan by 70 votes to 34, 19 and 3 respectively.

Shortly after being appointed McConnell began making appointments to his cabinet. Jim Wallace remained in the post of deputy first minister while Cathy Jamieson took over Mr McConnell's education brief and Wendy Alexander and Ross Finnie remained as ministers. Sam Galbraith and Angus MacKay stood down and Jackie Baillie, Sarah Boyack and Tom McCabe reshuffled out of government, while Susan Deacon was offered the post of social justice minister but refused the offer and moved to the backbenches. Cathy Jamieson, Mike Watson, Malcolm Chisholm, Iain Gray, Patricia Ferguson and Andy Kerr were all promoted to cabinet.

Wendy Alexander resigned for her post of Enterprise Minister on 4 May 2002. Her vacancy was filled by Iain Gray, and his post as Social Justice Minister was in turn filled by Margaret Curran, who had been his deputy. Hugh Henry left the post of Deputy Minister for Health and Community Care on 9 May 2002, and took up the post of Deputy Minister for Social Justice. Frank McAveety filled his vacancy. Richard Simpson resigned from his post as Deputy Justice Minister on 26 November 2002, and was replaced by Hugh Henry. Des McNulty filled Henry's vacancy as Deputy Health Minister.

In the 2003 Scottish Parliament election, the Labour–Liberal Democrat coalition was renewed and Jack McConnell returned to a second term as first minister and formed a second administration.

Cabinet

Junior ministers

References

Scottish governments
2001 establishments in Scotland
2003 disestablishments in Scotland
Coalition governments of the United Kingdom
Ministries of Elizabeth II